ENT Ltd, standing for Examiner-Northern TV Ltd, is a private shell company owned by WIN Corporation. In its heyday, ENT was a publicly listed Australian media company based in Launceston, Tasmania. It was run by major shareholder Edmund Rouse until 1994, when a bribery scandal led to Rouse stepping down as managing director and it was taken over by WIN Corporation.

Previous entities in direct control by ENT Ltd

Print media
The Examiner newspaper (Launceston)

Television stations

TasTV
TVT-6 Hobart (now WIN Tasmania)
TNT-9 Launceston (now Seven Tasmania)

The Six Network (later VIC Television)
BTV-6 Ballarat (now WIN Victoria)
GMV-6 Shepparton (now WIN Victoria)
STV-8 Mildura (now WIN Mildura)

Radio stations

7EX Launceston (now Chilli 90.1fm)
7HT Hobart (now Triple M)
3SR Shepparton
3UL Warragul (now (now 531 3GG)
3UZ Melbourne (now RSN Racing & Sport)
Four Californian radio stations
Two Oregon radio stations

Other assets

 Holyman (shipping)
 Gunns (forestry)
 Village Cinemas Tasmania (cinemas, 50 per cent joint venture with Village Roadshow)

Filmpac Holdings was a film and video distributor. ENT acquired a 40 per cent stake in 1988 from its purchase of Victoria-based media company Associated Broadcasting Services. From 1986 to 1990, Filmpac released a total of 69 films theatrically making it the country's largest independent mainstream theatrical distributor. The company collapsed in 1990 with its film library purchased by Village Roadshow.

ENT's 1988 annual report described the company's principal activities as television, newspapers, radio, commercial printing, motels, travel agencies, picture theatres, property development and investment.

References 

Companies formerly listed on the Australian Securities Exchange
Defunct broadcasting companies of Australia